Busan Rock Festival, inaugurated in 2000, is an outdoor music festival that takes place every summer in Busan. It is one of South Korea's longest running modern music festivals. The lineups include acts of various genres such as rock, metal, indie. The admission was free of charge until 2019, when it transitioned into a ticketed event. Busan Rock Festival has been conducting an artist exchange project by promoting international exchanges.

2000 line-up 
15 July ~ 17 July, Gwangalli Beach, Busan

2001 line-up 
11 August ~ 13 August, Gwangalli Beach, Busan

2002 line-up 
1 June ~ 3 June, Gwangalli Beach, Busan

2003 line-up 
7 August ~ 9 August, Da-Dae-Po Beach, Busan

2004 line-up 
5 August ~ 7 August, Da-Dae-Po Beach, Busan

2005 line-up 
5 August ~ 7 August, Da-Dae-Po Beach, Busan

2006 line-up 
5 August ~ 7 August, Da-Dae-Po Beach, Busan

2007 line-up 
4 August ~ 5 August, Da-Dae-Po Beach, Busan

2008 line-up 
2 August ~ 3 August, Da-Dae-Po Beach, Busan

2009 line-up 
7 August ~ 9 August, Da-Dae-Po Beach, Busan

2010 line-up 
6 August ~ 8 August, Da-Dae-Po Beach, Busan

2011 line-up 
5 August ~ 7 August, Samrak Park, Busan

2012 line-up 
3 August ~ 5 August, Samrak Park, Busan

2018 line-up 
10 August ~ 12 August, Samnak Ecological Park, Busan

2019 line-up 
27 July ~ 28 July, Samnak Ecological Park, Busan

2021 line-up 
2 October, Samnak Ecological Park, Busan

2022 line-up 
1 October ~ 2 October, Samnak Ecological Park, Busan

See also

List of music festivals in South Korea

Notes

External links
Official web site

Music festivals established in 2000
Music festivals in South Korea
K-pop festivals
Electronic music festivals in South Korea
Rock festivals in South Korea
Busan
2000 establishments in South Korea
Annual events in South Korea
Festivals in Busan
Summer events in South Korea